Mahindarama Buddhist Temple is a Sri Lankan temple situated in Jalan Kampar of George Town of Penang in Malaysia. It is the sole and the oldest Malaysian Sri Lankan temple in the state which is also one of the few temples in Malaysia where the Buddha's relics are stored. The temple became a focal point for the Candle Lighting Day and the annual Wesak festival within the city suburb.

History 

The temple was founded in 1918 by A. Pemaratana Maha Thera, a Ceylonese monk who made a visit on Penang Island en route to Singapore. Whilst in George Town, A. Pemaratana resided within the Batu Lanchang Hokkien Cemetery where he gave sermons to a handful of devotees. The devotees, led by M. V. Gregory, a fellow Sinhalese bought a piece of land at Caunter Hall and presented it to the monk to set up the first Sri Lankan-style Buddhist temple in Penang. A shrine hall was then built with the support of the devotees for Pemaratana to carry out his missionary work along with a school named "Sāriputta" to teach Theravāda Buddhism and the English language. The temple were subsequently named as "Caunter Hall Buddhist Temple". But since the given land is prone to flooding, a new site was required for the temple relocation. With the sudden demise of Pemaratana in 1927, the responsibilities of the temple were then given to his only pupil, W. Sumanasara Thero who later continued the relocation and construction of the additional structure for the temple in its present location in Jalan Kampar in the 1930s.

Features 
A number of additional buildings were built for the temple including a library and a school which was completed in 1957 and 1959 respectively, followed by a bell tower in 1969 and later a multi-purpose building in 1991. In 2001, the temple was chosen as the first temple in Malaysia to house the Buddha's relics which then received by the temple's Chief Monk, E. Inda-rátana Maha Thera. The two bone fragments of the Buddha are currently displayed within the temple's main prayer hall. Pema-rátana's ashes were enshrined in a stupa erected at the temple compound. His legacy can also be seen to this day in the form of the temple's ficus religiosa (Bodhi tree), said to be a descendant of the original Bodhi tree bought to Anuradhapura in Upatissa Nuwara (present-day Sri Lanka) by bhikkhunī Saṅghamittā under which Buddha attained enlightenment. The tree sapling was then brought from then British Ceylon in the 20th century and planted in the temple compound after Pemaratana's demise in 1927. The main prayer hall called Sīma is adorned with carvings by Sri Lankan artisans with all the materials used for the decorations originally coming from Sri Lanka.

References

External links 
 
 
Free Publications available at Mahindarama Buddhist Temple

Religious buildings and structures completed in 1933
Buddhist temples in Malaysia
Religious buildings and structures in Penang
Tourist attractions in George Town, Penang
Overseas Sri Lankan Buddhist temples
Sri Lankan Theravada Buddhist temples and monasteries
Buddhist relics
Religious organizations established in 1918
20th-century Buddhist temples